Chloraea elegans is an orchid species endemic to the Salta region of Argentina.

References

External links 

Chloraeinae
Plants described in 1969
Orchids of Argentina